Lily Beach (1993) is a literary novel by Jennie Fields.  Her first published work, this story is set in the 1960s and focuses on the character Lily Beach as she struggles with a past of abuse.  Lily travels to Illinois and three different men to escape her past.

Originally published by Atheneum Books and currently published by Grand Central Publishing, a member of Hachette Book Group USA, Lily Beach is currently unavailable except through Hachette Book Group USA's Print On Demand service.

Characters
Lily Beach
Ted
Jack
Will Sternhagen
Andre Pulaski
Wally Payson
Chris Codman
Louise Lewis

Notes

1993 novels
American romance novels
Novels set in Illinois
Fiction set in the 1960s
Novels by Jennie Fields
1993 debut novels
Atheneum Books books